The International Journal of Quantum Chemistry is a peer-reviewed scientific journal publishing original, primary research and review articles on all aspects of quantum chemistry, including an expanded scope focusing on aspects of materials science, biochemistry, biophysics, quantum physics, quantum information theory, etc. 

According to the Journal Citation Reports, the journal has a 2020 impact factor of 2.444.

It was established in 1967 by Per-Olov Löwdin. In 2011, the journal moved to an in-house editorial office model, in which a permanent team of full-time, professional editors is responsible for article scrutiny and editorial content.

References

External links 
 

Chemistry journals
Publications established in 1967
Hybrid open access journals
Wiley (publisher) academic journals
English-language journals
Computational chemistry